Ottaviano–San Pietro–Musei Vaticani is a station on Line A of the Rome Metro.

The station is situated at the junction of Viale Giulio Cesare with Via Ottaviano and Via Barletta, in Prati.

Since 2006 the station has been the site of archaeological excavations in preparation for the construction of Line C. It will form an interchange station between lines A and C.

Located nearby
 Vatican City
 Basilica di San Pietro
 Piazza San Pietro
 via della Conciliazione
 Piazza del Risorgimento
 Borgo
 Prati
 Piazza dei Quiriti
 Teatro Giulio Cesare
 Via Candia

References

External links
 Ottaviano - San Pietro station on the Rome public transport site. (in Italian)

Rome Metro Line A stations
Railway stations opened in 1980
1980 establishments in Italy
Rome R. XXII Prati
Railway stations in Italy opened in the 20th century